Presidential elections were held in the Comoros on 30 September 1984. Incumbent President Ahmed Abdallah of the Comorian Union for Progress (the sole legal party) was the only candidate, and received the support of 99.4% of voters.

Results

References

Single-candidate elections
Presidential elections in the Comoros
President
One-party elections
Comoros
Election and referendum articles with incomplete results